Charles Pomeroy Otis (April 8, 1840 – November 17, 1888) was an American educator and author.

Otis, son of the Rev. Israel T. Otis and Olive M. (Osgood) Otis, was born in Lebanon, Connecticut, where his father was then pastor, on April 8, 1840. In 1844 his father removed to Rye, N. H., from which place he entered Yale College.  After graduation in 1861 he was for nearly a year principal of an academy in Fairfield, Connecticut, and then became a teacher in General Russell's school in New Haven, where he remained until he entered on a tutorship (in Latin) in the college, in January, 1865. July, 1869, he resigned this office, and he spent the next three years in Europe, chiefly in study in Paris and Berlin. Then followed an additional year of study at Yale, for the completion of his course for the Doctorate of Philosophy, which he obtained in 1873. In the same summer he was appointed to the Professorship of Modern Languages in the Massachusetts Institute of Technology, which he occupied until his death. His life as a teacher was a very busy one, and he broke down in health early in the year 1888. He died at his home in Boston, on November 17 of 1888, after a brief attack of inflammation of the brain, at 49 years old.

Professor Otis was married, June 11, 1884, to Sarah Margaret Noyes, of Boston, who survived him with two sons.

Otis published a Grammar of Elementary German, which passed through several editions, and edited for the use of his classes a number of German texts.

References

External links
 
 
 

1840 births
1888 deaths
People from Lebanon, Connecticut
Yale College alumni
MIT School of Humanities, Arts, and Social Sciences faculty
American male writers
People from Rye, New Hampshire